Taj McGowan (born December 30, 1996) is an American football running back who is a free agent. He played college football at UCF, where he rushed for 470 yards and 8 touchdowns his senior season.

Professional career
McGowan appeared in a rookie minicamp for the Jaguars after going undrafted in the 2019 NFL Draft, and was signed by the Jaguars on June 5, 2019. He was waived/injured on July 31, 2019, and placed on injured reserve. He was waived with a failed physical designation on April 20, 2020.

References 

1996 births
Living people
Sportspeople from Hollywood, Florida
Players of American football from Florida
African-American players of American football
American football running backs
UCF Knights football players
Jacksonville Jaguars players
21st-century African-American sportspeople